Manny Pacquiao vs. Keith Thurman, was a boxing match for the WBA (Super) welterweight championship. The event took place on July 20, 2019 at the MGM Grand Garden Arena in Las Vegas, Nevada. Pacquiao won the fight by split decision and, at 40 years old, became the oldest welterweight to win a major world title in boxing history. The bout sold 500,000 pay-per-view (PPV) buys in the United States, earning an estimated  in pay-per-view revenue.

Background 
After Thurman's fight with Josesito López, he publicly said he wanted to fight Pacquiao next. It was initially thought that Errol Spence Jr. would be next on Pacquiao's list when he came up the ring after Spence easily disposed of Mikey Garcia. It had also been rumored that Pacquiao would be facing Thurman next and Spence would instead have a unification bout with Shawn Porter. On May 11, 2019 it was announced that Pacquiao–Thurman would happen on July 20, 2019 and a few days after, MGM Grand Garden Arena announced that they would be hosting the fight. Betting odds started in favor of Thurman but slowly went Pacquiao's way as the fight drew closer. Throughout the promotion, Thurman had nice things to say about Pacquiao being a legend as a sign of respect and would follow it up with how he planned on finishing Pacquiao's career.

Fight details 
Pacquiao won the WBA (Super) welterweight title against Thurman via split decision and became the oldest welterweight to win a major title in boxing history. Late in the first round, Pacquiao caught Thurman with a right hand and knocked him down, as Thurman was moving backwards after a Pacquiao a fast combination of body and head punches. Rounds one through five were vintage for Pacquiao as he bloodied Thurman's nose and forced him into a very intense fight. Thurman looked to have regained his composure in the middle rounds, adjusted to Pacquiao's offense in the second half of the fight and was able to catch him with some hard shots. Pacquiao though, would catch Thurman again in the tenth round, this time with a vicious left hook to the body that had Thurman moving around the ring, trying to survive the round. Thurman was visibly hurt and later admitted, "The body shot was a terrific body shot. I even took my mouthpiece out of my mouth just so I could breathe a little deeper". Two judges ruled in favor of Pacquiao with a score of 115–112 and one in favor of Thurman with a score of 114–113. Many people, including Pacquiao himself, felt that the first-round knockdown and the tenth-round body shot rightfully secured him the win.

According to CompuBox, Thurman was the more accurate boxer and outlanded Pacquiao. Pacquiao only landed 113 out of 340 of his power punches (33%) against Thurman's 192 out of 443 power punches (43%). Pacquiao was the busier fighter and had a difference of more than 100 punches compared to Thurman. Total punch stats were 195 out of 686 (28%) for Pacquiao and 210 out of 571 (37%) for Thurman.

With the victory, Pacquiao also became the first boxer to become a recognized four-time welterweight champion, breaking his tie with Jack Britton and Emile Griffith.

Official scorecards

Fight card

Broadcasting 

The fight was televised on PPV's Fox in the United States and both Sky Sports and Cignal in the Philippines. ABS-CBN also had exclusive rights to broadcast the fight on Philippine free-to-air.

National anthem singers 
  "Lupang Hinirang" – The First Word Choir
  "The Star-Spangled Banner" – Lorena Peril

References 

2019 in boxing
2019 in Philippine sport
Thurman
Boxing in Las Vegas
MGM Grand Garden Arena